Louis Carl Dobbs (born September 24, 1945) is an American political commentator, author, and former television host who presented Lou Dobbs Tonight from 2003 to 2009 and 2011 to 2021. He quit this job a day after Smartmatic launched a 2.7 billion dollar lawsuit against Fox News. He is currently under scrutiny for his role is the dissemination of electoral fraud.  Since 2021, he hosts The Great America Show on iHeart Radio and loudobbs.com.

Dobbs started working with CNN at its inception in 1980, serving as a reporter and network vice president. On the air, he served as host and managing editor of the network's business program, Moneyline, which premiered in 1980. The show was renamed Lou Dobbs Tonight in 2003. Dobbs resigned from CNN in 1999 but rejoined the network in 2001. He resigned once again in November 2009. He is the former talk radio host of Lou Dobbs Radio. From 2011, he hosted Lou Dobbs Tonight on the Fox Business Network until its cancellation in February 2021.

Dobbs was an early promoter of Birtherism, a conspiracy theory that falsely stated that former U.S. President Barack Obama is not a natural born US citizen. He is known for anti-immigration views, as well as for opposition to NAFTA and other trade deals. A staunch Donald Trump supporter, he infused his show with pro-Trump coverage. He was one of three Fox Corporation program hosts named in a $2.7 billion defamation suit by Smartmatic relating to false conspiracy theories used in attempts to overturn the 2020 United States presidential election.

Early life and education
Born in Childress County, Texas in 1945, Dobbs is the son of Frank Dobbs, a co-owner of a propane business, and Lydia Mae (née Hensley), a bookkeeper. When Dobbs was age twelve, his father's propane business failed and the family moved to Rupert, Idaho. Although accepted at the University of Idaho and Idaho State University, he was persuaded by the staff at Minico High School to apply to Harvard University, where he was accepted and graduated in 1967 with a Bachelor of Arts degree in economics. While at Harvard, Dobbs lived in Quincy House and was elected to the Owl Club.

Career
After college, Dobbs worked for federal anti-poverty programs in Boston and Washington, D.C., then returned to Idaho. He briefly attended the University of Idaho College of Law in Moscow, and then worked as a cash-management specialist for Union Bank of California in Los Angeles. He married his high school sweetheart in 1969, and in 1970 their first son was born. Dobbs moved to Yuma, Arizona, and got a job as a police and fire reporter for KBLU. By the mid-1970s, he was a television anchor and reporter in Phoenix, and he later joined Seattle's KING-TV. In 1979, he was contacted by a recruiter for Ted Turner, who was in the process of forming CNN.

CNN 
Dobbs joined CNN when it launched in 1980, serving as its chief economics correspondent and as host of the business news program Moneyline on CNN. Dobbs also served as a corporate executive for CNN, as its executive vice president and as a member of CNN's executive committee. He founded CNN fn (CNN financial news), serving as its president and anchoring the program Business Unusual, which examined business creativity and leadership.

Departure and founding of Space.com
Dobbs repeatedly clashed with Rick Kaplan, who became president of CNN in 1997. Dobbs said Kaplan, a friend of then president Bill Clinton, was "clearly partisan" and "was pushing Clinton stories", while Kaplan said Dobbs was "a very difficult person to work with."

On April 20, 1999, CNN was covering Clinton's speech in Littleton, Colorado, following the Columbine High School massacre. Dobbs ordered the producer to cut away from the speech and return to broadcast Moneyline. Dobbs was countermanded by Kaplan, who ordered CNN to return to the speech. Kaplan later said, "Tell me what journalistic reason there was not to cover the president at Columbine soon after the shootings? Everyone else was doing it". Dobbs announced on the air that "CNN President Rick Kaplan wants us to return to Littleton." A few days later, Dobbs announced that he was leaving the network to start Space.com, a website devoted to astronautical news. Dobbs was subsequently replaced as host of Moneyline by Willow Bay and Stuart Varney.

Space.com
Dobbs announced that he was leaving CNN to start up the site Space.com in July 1999. Dobbs was one of the primary shareholders in that company and later that year became Space.com's chief executive officer. Dobbs returned to CNN in 2001.

Return to CNN
Kaplan left CNN in August 2000, and Dobbs returned the following year, at the behest of his friend and CNN founder Ted Turner, becoming host and managing editor of the new and initially more general news program Lou Dobbs Reporting, which later became CNN News Sunday Morning. He also regained the helm of the newly renamed Lou Dobbs Moneyline (which became Lou Dobbs Tonight in June 2003).

According to The Washington Post, Dobbs started to increasingly focus on the alleged dangers of illegal immigration after returning to CNN. Dobbs became a self-described populist after his return to CNN, and criticized the "greed" of big corporations and their opposition to raising the minimum wage.

Exit from CNN
In July 2009, controversy around Dobbs began when he was the only mainstream news anchor to give airtime to the birther theory. Several media watch groups, including Media Matters and the Southern Poverty Law Center, criticized Dobbs for his reporting. The controversy eventually caused CNN President Jon Klein to rein Dobbs in via an internal memorandum. In September, advocates challenged Dobbs for appearing at a conference organized by the pro-border security group Federation for American Immigration Reform. Multiple campaigns were launched, including "Drop Dobbs" (NDN, Media Matters). The campaigns also attacked CNN for alleged hypocrisy towards Latinos, citing CNN's Latino in America special as incompatible with their continued support of Dobbs. The campaigns generated considerable anti-Dobbs press.

On the November 11, 2009, edition of his nightly broadcast Lou Dobbs Tonight, Dobbs announced his immediate departure from CNN, ending a nearly thirty-year career at the network, citing plans to "pursue new opportunities." CNN President Jon Klein said that Dobbs's departure was not a result of organized opposition to Dobbs's viewpoints.

Dobbs was reportedly paid $8 million in severance pay when he left CNN.

After Dobbs left CNN in 2009, he gave an interview where he did not rule out the possibility of running for President of the United States in 2012, saying the final decision would rest with his wife. Former Senator Dean Barkley said he thought Dobbs should run for president.

Radio
From 2008 to 2012, Dobbs hosted Lou Dobbs Radio on United Stations Radio Networks. The three-hour daily show had affiliates in several major markets, including its flagship station (WOR) in New York City, Washington D.C. (WHFS), Miami (WZAB-AM) and the San Francisco Bay Area (KDOW), as well as stations such as WGNY-AM in Newburgh, New York. The show was guest-centered and featured political discussion and listener calls. It aired from 2 to 5 pm Eastern, directly competing with The Sean Hannity Show, The Tom Sullivan Show and The Dave Ramsey Show. Dobbs also hosts the financially themed Lou Dobbs Minute on the same network.

In June 2008, Dobbs reached an agreement with Business Talk Radio Network to carry a rebroadcast of the show from 7 to 10 pm Eastern, displacing Bruce Williams. Dobbs's show was also carried live on CRN Digital Talk Radio Networks.

Dobbs was among the hosts who tried out for the position vacated by the cancellation of Imus in the Morning on WFAN, a position that was eventually filled by Boomer and Carton in the Morning. Dobbs mentioned on his radio show that he was seeking a position in the US Department of Treasury during the economic crisis. He stated that he believed he could "do more good than the clowns currently in position."

Dobbs also is a regular columnist in Money magazine, U.S. News & World Report, and the New York Daily News.

Fox Business Network
On November 10, 2010, Fox Business Network announced that Dobbs would host a show on the channel. The network announced on March 3, 2011, the start date, show title, and time slot of Dobbs's new show. Entitled Lou Dobbs Tonight, the program debuted on March 14, 2011.

On February 4, 2021, voting machine company Smartmatic filed a $2.7 billion defamation suit against multiple parties, including Dobbs and two other Fox Corporation program hosts, asserting they had promoted conspiracy theories alleging the company and its competitor Dominion Voting Systems had participated in an international conspiracy to rig the 2020 presidential election against Donald Trump. The three programs had each run a video retraction weeks earlier, after receiving a demand letter from Smartmatic, though neither Dobbs nor the other hosts personally issued retractions.

Venezuelan businessman Majed Khalil sued Dobbs, Fox News and Sidney Powell for $250 million in December 2021, alleging they had falsely implicated him in rigging Dominion and Smartmatic machines.  A New York State Supreme Court judge ruled in March 2022 that the Smartmatic suit against Fox News could proceed, dismissing allegations against two individuals, though claims against Dobbs were allowed to stand.

The show was canceled by Fox News on February 5, 2021. The Los Angeles Times reported the decision had been under consideration before the Smartmatic legal issues arose. Brian Stelter and Oliver Darcy of CNN Business claimed that, despite being the highest-rated Fox Business Network program, it was a loss leader because many advertisers did not want to be associated with the content.

Other appearances

Since 2009, Dobbs has made regular appearances to discuss issues on other news network programs including CNBC's The Kudlow Report and Fox News Channel's The O'Reilly Factor. On October 5, 2010, Dobbs made a guest appearance on an episode of The Good Wife, entitled "Double Jeopardy", in which he plays himself as a client in search of a new law firm to represent his legal interests.

Political views and controversies
Dobbs is known for his anti-immigration views, warnings about Islamist terrorism, and his opposition to outsourcing. He is also known for his pro-Trump coverage.

China
In December 2018, Dobbs suggested that the United States should start a war with China because of hacking by Chinese state actors. He compared hacking by the People's Liberation Army of China to the attack by the Japanese military on Pearl Harbor in 1941.

Birtherism
Dobbs promoted the theory that Barack Obama was not born in the United States. His willingness to raise the "birther" issue repeatedly, even though CNN itself considered it a "discredited rumor", led The Washington Posts TV critic to remark that this "explains their upcoming documentary: 'The World: Flat. We Report – You Decide.'" The issue had come up in 2008 during the Presidential campaign, and had largely disappeared from the media spotlight until Dobbs picked up the issue again. His statements in support of these conspiracy theories were dubbed "racist" and "defamatory" by the Southern Poverty Law Center. The controversy led to Media Matters airing ads critical of Dobbs and of CNN, and to Jon Stewart mocking Dobbs on the satirical Comedy Central television series The Daily Show. The Associated Press said that Dobbs had "become a publicity nightmare for CNN, embarrassed his boss and hosted a show that seemed to contradict the network's 'no bias' brand."

Environment
Dobbs rejects the scientific consensus on climate change. Dobbs has misleadingly asserted that "scientists" warned of global cooling in the 1970s, though that was a distinctly minority view. He said of the Obama administration's EPA that it was being run as if it were "part of the apparat of the Soviet Union."

Immigration
Dobbs holds anti-immigration views. Dobbs has been strongly opposed to both illegal immigration and foreign worker programs as the H-1B visa program and guest-worker programs. In a 2006 article, Dobbs expressed frustration at failed legislation to build a southern "border fence to stop the flow of illegal aliens and drugs across our borders." He argued that the "true victims of corporate America's lust for cheap labor" were "American working men and women, taxpayers all." During efforts to implement comprehensive immigration reform during the Bush administration in 2007, Dobbs devoted more than a quarter of all of his airtime during a three-month period to the subject of immigration, and covered it negatively.

Dobbs's show has made factually incorrect claims, such as the one that illegal immigrants were responsible for bringing 7,000 new cases of leprosy to the United States in a three-year period, where the actual timeframe was over the last thirty years. In addressing the leprosy issue, Dobbs in May 2007 compared his critics from the left and right political spectrums to "commies" and "fascists." Dobbs has also falsely claimed that "illegal aliens" were a third of the federal prison population in the United States.

Dobbs has criticized local officials for their approach to border security. In October 2007 he labeled then-New York Governor Eliot Spitzer an "idiot" for advocating the issuance of driver's licenses to illegal immigrants. Hillary Clinton labeled Dobbs's illegal immigration segments as having "all that hot air."

In March 2009, Dobbs said he thought that there should not be a St. Patrick's Day.

In a November 2009 interview with Telemundo, Dobbs said that the U.S. needed a "rational, effective humane policy" for immigration that included enhanced border security and also "the ability to legalize illegal immigrants on certain conditions."

In October 2010, The Nation published the results of a yearlong investigation detailing undocumented workers who had worked on Dobbs's personal properties. The labor involved upkeep of Dobbs's multimillion-dollar estates in New Jersey and Florida, including the horses belonging to his daughter, Hillary, a champion show jumper. The article featured interviews with five immigrants who had worked without papers on Dobbs's properties. Speaking to the Associated Press, Dobbs referred to the article as "a political assault," claiming it was a lie that he hired illegal immigrants. He said: "I have never, do not now, and never will."

In November 2018, Dobbs falsely claimed that "many" undocumented immigrants voted in the 2018 mid-term elections and that they had an "immense impact."

Dobbs's critics, including columnist James K. Glassman, author of Dow 36,000 and member of the American Enterprise Institute think tank, have accused him of inciting xenophobia. Others have accused him of Hispanophobia, a charge he denies and one which he has said offends him deeply, as his wife Debi Segura is a Mexican American.

After President Donald Trump stated in March 2019 that he supported legal immigration "in the largest numbers ever," Dobbs lamented that Trump was advancing "the interests of the global elite ahead of our citizens," adding, "the White House has simply lost its way."

Support for Trump 
Dobbs's coverage of the Trump presidency was extremely supportive, with some outlets describing it as fawning and sycophantic. Fox News president Jay Wallace said in a September 2020 private message to a colleague that "the North Koreans do a more nuanced show" than Dobbs. Dobbs opened a November 2017 interview with Trump with "You have accomplished so much", and later said to Trump that he was "one of the most loved and respected" presidents "in history". The New York Times described the interview as a love-fest and "courtier-like session", as Dobbs "didn't so much ask questions as open his mouth and let rose petals fall out". During Trump's presidency, Dobbs has been described as a "close informal adviser to President Donald Trump". Trump repeatedly calls Dobbs to get his views on various policy issues.

Dobbs is a proponent of the Deep State theory. In January 2018, Dobbs called for a "war" on the "Deep State", which he described as the FBI and the Department of Justice. Dobbs said that the FBI and DOJ had destroyed evidence and that they were clandestinely working to bring down the Trump presidency. In June 2018, Dobbs promoted a conspiracy which originated on Reddit and the far-right conspiracy website Gateway Pundit that "the FBI may have initiated a number of spies into the Trump campaign as early as December of 2015". Shortly after Dobbs promoted the unfounded conspiracy theory, Trump retweeted Dobbs's assertion and praised Dobbs for a "great interview". In July 2018, Dobbs said that Special Counsel Robert Mueller was on a "jihad" against Trump, and accused him of seeking to "subvert" and "overthrow" Trump's presidency. In December 2018, Dobbs said there was "a legion of evildoers" in the FBI and that "we've got all of the folks in the FBI, corrupt, politically corrupt." That same month, he said that the judge overseeing Michael Flynn's sentencing sounded as if he was part of Mueller's "witch hunt."

In July 2018, Dobbs defended the Trump administration's decision to ban a CNN reporter from a press event. Multiple Fox colleagues, including Fox News President Jay Wallace, had shown solidarity with CNN and called on the White House to rescind the ban. His defense led to charges of hypocrisy: in 2012, when a Daily Caller reporter was criticized by the White House for shouting out a question during an address by Obama, Dobbs defended the reporter, saying "What is rude is a president not speaking to the American people and taking the questions of the White House press'. CNN's Jake Tapper suggested that Dobbs was hypocritical.

In August 2018, Dobbs ran a segment pushing unsubstantiated claims that Google was biased against Trump and that Google was promoting anti-Trump stories. Following Dobbs's segment, Trump tweeted that Google was suppressing conservatives and he tasked economic adviser Larry Kudlow to look into regulating Google.

In September 2018, after Trump falsely claimed that the official death count from Hurricane Maria in Puerto Rico was fabricated by Democrats, Dobbs defended Trump's assertion. Dobbs claimed that "the numbers were inflated" and that the organizations behind the numbers "threw out science, statistics, and evidence to discredit the Trump administration".

In October 2018, when CNN and prominent Democrats were targeted with bomb attempts, Dobbs described the bomb attempts as "fake news" and promoted conspiracy theories that the bomb attempts were by Democrats who sought to increase their support in the upcoming mid-term elections. Several Fox News employees expressed dismay over Dobbs's rhetoric, with one employee telling CNN, "It's people like Dobbs who really ruin it for all the hard working journalists at Fox".

When the Trump administration rescinded CNN White House correspondent Jim Acosta's press pass, Dobbs supported the administration. At the same time, numerous media organizations, including Fox News, spoke out against the Trump administration's decision. When U.S. District Court Judge Timothy J. Kelly, a Trump appointee, temporarily restored Acosta's press pass, Dobbs described the ruling as "absurd." When the Trump administration complied with the ruling, Dobbs called on the administration to ignore the ruling and tell the "district court judge to go to hell."

In January 2019, Dobbs described Mitt Romney as a "traitor" and "treasonous" after he wrote an op-ed published in The Washington Post criticizing Trump's character. In July 2019, Dobbs referred to U.S. military generals who raised concerns about Trump's decision to put on a July 4 military show in Washington D.C. as "Snowflake Generals".

During the impeachment trial of Donald Trump, The New York Times reported that former Trump national security advisor and 11-year paid contributor to Fox News John Bolton had written in his forthcoming book that Trump had told him that he wanted to continue withholding aid to Ukraine until the country investigated Democrats and the Bidens. On his show the following day, Dobbs asserted that Bolton had been "reduced to a tool for the radical Dems and the deep state with his allegation."

The day senior Justice Department officials intervened in the case of longtime Trump associate Roger Stone with a recommendation of a lighter sentence than had been recommended by DOJ prosecutors the prior day, Dobbs stated on his program that attorney general Bill Barr was "doing the Lord's work" by intervening. The intervention raised questions about the political neutrality of the DOJ. The next day, Barr stated in a televised interview that Trump's comments about ongoing DOJ investigations "make it impossible to do my job," causing Dobbs to state on his program, "I guess I am so disappointed in Bill Barr, I have to say this – it's a damn shame when he doesn't get what this president has gone through, and what the American people have gone through, and what his charge is as attorney general." The following day, after the Justice Department stated it would not prosecute former FBI deputy director Andrew McCabe, a frequent target of Trump's ire, Dobbs stated on his program, "I have serious, serious questions tonight about the integrity of the Justice Department under Attorney General Barr."

As Trump, his surrogates and supporters made baseless claims of voting fraud in the aftermath of his 2020 election defeat, Dobbs chastised Republicans for not helping the president to claim "what is rightfully his." He said that Republicans who voted to certify Joe Biden's Electoral College win were "criminal." After Attorney General Bill Barr said there was no evidence of widespread fraud in the election, Dobbs said that Barr was "compromised" and had become part of the "deep state." 

In December 2020, Dobbs aired a segment on his show debunking the very same conspiracy theories that had been amplified on his show; this was in response to a legal threat by the voting technology company Smartmatic which had been the subject of some of the conspiracy theorizing. Speaking to Republican consultant Ed Rollins during his January 4, 2021 broadcast, Dobbs said:We're eight weeks from the election, and we still don't have verifiable, tangible support for the crimes that everyone knows were committed — that is, defrauding other citizens who voted with fraudulent votes. We know that's the case in Nevada, we know it's the case in Pennsylvania and a number of other states, but we have had a devil of a time finding actual proof. Why?Following the storming of the United States Capitol by Trump supporters in January 2021, Dobbs was among those who advanced the conspiracy theory that people associated with antifa were responsible for the attack.

George Soros conspiracy theories
Dobbs has peddled numerous conspiracy theories about the Jewish-American philanthropist and businessman George Soros. Dobbs has referred to him as an "evil SOB" and insidious.

Dobbs's Fox Business Channel shows stirred controversy in October 2018 when a guest on Dobbs's show used what many described as an anti-Semitic trope to suggest that the State Department was "Soros-occupied" territory echoing the anti-Semitic conspiracy theory of a "Zionist-occupied government". The remarks came days after bombing attempts on Soros and leading Democrats, and the remarks were replayed on Fox Business hours after an anti-Semitic gunman at a Pittsburgh synagogue killed 11 people.

After widespread condemnation, Fox stated that the guest, Chris Farrell of Judicial Watch, would no longer be booked and that the program episode would be withdrawn from the Fox News archives. In the midst of the Trump-Ukraine scandal in November 2019, attorney Joseph diGenova made similar comments on Dobbs's program, falsely claiming that "George Soros controls a very large part of the career foreign service of the United States State Department. He also controls the activities of FBI agents overseas who work for NGOs – work with NGOs. That was very evident in Ukraine." Dobbs did not dispute DiGenova's claim.

On September 11, 2019, Dobbs warned his viewers on Fox Business that Soros's "tentacles were spreading globally".

Other views
Dobbs has stated that he is pro-choice, though in June 2022 he retweeted a post from a Twitter user that said: "So much winning!" in reference to the overturning of Roe v. Wade. Dobbs opposes gun control and, though he is a fiscal conservative, supports some government regulations, as revealed in a 60 Minutes interview. He has been critical of trade policies that he says encourage "sending jobs overseas".

Dobbs's stance on trade has earned plaudits from some trade union activists on the traditional political left, while his stance on immigration tends to appeal to the right.

Dobbs is the author of War on the Middle Class, in which he claims that both Democrats and Republicans are harming the middle class. In it, he comes out strongly against the Bush tax cuts, which he argues favor the wealthy, and argued for raising the U.S. minimum wage from what was then $5.15 an hour.

Reception 
Journalist Amy Goodman has criticized Dobbs's journalistic ethics, accusing him of making flagrant errors in his reporting and assailing his staff's association with what she describes as disreputable sources.

Awards
Dobbs has won numerous major awards for his television journalism, including a Lifetime Achievement Emmy Award and a Cable Ace Award. He received the George Foster Peabody Award for his coverage of the 1987 stock market crash. He also has received the Luminary Award of the Business Journalism Review in 1990, the Horatio Alger Association Award for Distinguished Americans in 1999 and the National Space Club Media Award in 2000. The Wall Street Journal has named Dobbs "TV's Premier Business News Anchorman". In 2004, Dobbs was awarded the Eugene Katz Award For Excellence in the Coverage of Immigration by the Center for Immigration Studies and in 2005 he received the Alexis de Tocqueville Institution's Statesmanship Award. Dobbs was named "Father of the Year" by the National Father's Day Committee in 1993. In 2008 Dobbs received the American Legion Public Relations Award from the National Commander of The American Legion.

Personal life 
Dobbs divorced his first wife in 1981 and later married Debi Lee Segura, a former CNN sports anchor. The couple raised four children together. Dobbs resides on a  horse farm in Wantage Township, New Jersey.

Books
 Lou Dobbs, with James O. Born, Border War, Forge (2014). .
 Lou Dobbs, Independents Day: Awakening the American Spirit, Viking (2007). .
 Lou Dobbs, Exporting America: Why Corporate Greed Is Shipping American Jobs Overseas, Warner Books (2004). .
 Lou Dobbs, Space: The Next Business Frontier with HP Newquist, Pocket Books (2001). .
 Lou Dobbs, War on the Middle Class: How the Government, Big Business, and Special Interest Groups Are Waging War on the American Dream and How to Fight Back, Viking (2006). .
 Ron Hira and Anil Hira, with foreword by Lou Dobbs, Outsourcing America: What's Behind Our National Crisis and How We Can Reclaim American Jobs. (AMACOM) American Management Association (May 2005). .
 Lou Dobbs, Upheaval, Threshold Editions (2014), .
 Lou Dobbs and James O. Born, Putin's Gambit: A Novel (2017), .

References

External links

 Official website
 
 

1945 births
American business and financial journalists
American broadcast news analysts
American columnists
American male non-fiction writers
American political commentators
American political writers
American talk radio hosts
American whistleblowers
Carnegie Council for Ethics in International Affairs
CNN people
Corporate executives
Fox Business people
Fox News people
Harvard College alumni
Journalists from Texas
Living people
New Jersey Independents
News & Documentary Emmy Award winners
People from Childress County, Texas
People from Rupert, Idaho
People from Wantage Township, New Jersey
Television anchors from Seattle